Gastón Suso (born 12 March 1991) is an Argentine professional footballer who plays as a centre-back for Platense.

Career
Suso's career began in 2013 with Atlético de Rafaela. He didn't make a league appearance for the club, but did feature once during a Copa Argentina defeat to San Lorenzo on 19 June 2013. In July 2013, Suso departed Atlético de Rafaela to sign for Gimnasia y Tiro of Torneo Argentino A. He made his league debut on 18 August in a win over Tiro Federal, prior to scoring his first goal in May 2014 against Guillermo Brown. He made twenty-nine appearances in his first season, before fourteen and twelve in the two following seasons. 2016 saw Suso join fellow Torneo Federal A team Mitre. One goal in fourteen games followed.

On 5 July 2016, Suso was signed by Argentine Primera División side Godoy Cruz. He made his professional debut on 30 September in a home victory over Unión Santa Fe. In February 2017, Suso was loaned out to Primera B Metropolitana's Estudiantes. After completing his Estudiantes loan, Suso sealed a return to Atlético de Rafaela in June 2018.

Career statistics
.

References

External links

1991 births
Living people
Sportspeople from Santa Fe Province
Argentine footballers
Association football defenders
Argentine Primera División players
Torneo Argentino A players
Torneo Federal A players
Primera B Metropolitana players
Primera Nacional players
Atlético de Rafaela footballers
Gimnasia y Tiro footballers
Club Atlético Mitre footballers
Godoy Cruz Antonio Tomba footballers
Estudiantes de Buenos Aires footballers
Club Atlético Platense footballers
Arsenal de Sarandí footballers